Ketki Devi Singh (born 3 July 1958) is a Zila panchayat adhyaksh elected from the Gonda district constituency in the Indian  state of Uttar Pradesh being a Bhartiya Janta Party candidate.

Early life
Ketki was born on 3 July 1958 in Brijmanganj in Maharajganj district in (Uttar Pradesh). She married Brij Bhushan Sharan Singh on 11 May 1980. She has three sons and a daughter.

References

India MPs 1996–1997
Women in Uttar Pradesh politics
Lok Sabha members from Uttar Pradesh
Bharatiya Janata Party politicians from Uttar Pradesh
Articles created or expanded during Women's History Month (India) - 2014
1958 births
Living people
20th-century Indian women politicians
20th-century Indian politicians
People from Gonda district